Elizabeth Smylie (née Sayers, born 11 April 1963), sometimes known as Liz Smylie, is a retired Australian tennis player. During her career, she won four Grand Slam titles, one of them in women's doubles and three in mixed doubles. She also won three singles titles and 36 doubles titles on the tour.

Career
Smylie turned professional in 1982. She won the women's doubles title at Wimbledon in 1985 with Kathy Jordan. In mixed doubles, she teamed with John Fitzgerald to win the 1983 US Open and 1991 Wimbledon titles and with Todd Woodbridge to win the 1990 US Open. She won the Virginia Slims Championships with Jordan in 1990. Her best Grand Slam performance in singles came at the Australian Open in 1987, when she reached the quarterfinals. Her highest ever singles ranking was World No. 20 and her highest in doubles was World No. 5.

She played Federation Cup from 1984 to 1994, and won a bronze medal in women's doubles with Wendy Turnbull at the 1988 Summer Olympics in Seoul.

Over her career, Smylie won three singles titles and 36 doubles titles. She won the Western Australian Sports Star of the Year award in 1985 and the Comeback Player of the Year award in 1990 and 1993.

Personal life
She is married to player-manager Peter Smylie and they have three children, Laura, Jordan and Elvis. She was the long-time tournament director of the Australian Women's Hardcourts and also works as a sports television commentator.  Her brother Mervyn Sayers played one first-class cricket game for Western Australia in 1979.

Major finals

Grand Slam tournaments

Doubles: 5 (1 title, 4 runner-ups)

Mixed doubles: 8 (3 titles, 5 runner-ups)

Olympics

Doubles: 1 (bronze medal)

Smylie and Turnbull lost their semifinal match to Zina Garrison and Pam Shriver 6–7(5), 4–6. In 1988, there was no bronze medal play-off match, both beaten semifinal pairs received bronze medals.

Year-end championships

Doubles: 1 (1 title)

WTA career finals

Singles: 6 (3–3)

Doubles: 69 (36–33)

Grand Slam performance timelines

Singles

Doubles

NR = not ranked

Mixed doubles

References

External links
 
 
 
 

1963 births
Living people
Australian female tennis players
Hopman Cup competitors
Olympic bronze medalists for Australia
Olympic medalists in tennis
Olympic tennis players of Australia
Sportswomen from Western Australia
Tennis players from Perth, Western Australia
Tennis players at the 1988 Summer Olympics
US Open (tennis) champions
Wimbledon champions
Grand Slam (tennis) champions in women's doubles
Grand Slam (tennis) champions in mixed doubles
Medalists at the 1988 Summer Olympics